Peter Gerard Scully (born 13 January 1963) is an Australian sex offender imprisoned for life in the Philippines after being convicted of one count of human trafficking and five counts of rape by sexual assault of underage girls. He is pending trial for other crimes against children, including the production and dissemination of child pornography, torture, and the alleged murder of an 11-year-old girl in 2012.

Criminal activities 
Peter Scully lived in the suburb of Narre Warren in Melbourne with his wife and two children prior to fleeing to Manila in the Philippines in 2011 before he could be charged with his involvement in a property scheme that cost investors over  million. According to his own statement, he was sexually abused by a priest in Victoria when he grew up. Prior to leaving Melbourne, he operated an unlicensed online escort service which offered his Filipina girlfriend as a sex worker. An investigation by the Australian Securities & Investments Commission from 2009 found that Scully was involved in 117 fraud and deception offenses relating to real estate scams.

Sexual abuse of children
From the island of Mindanao, Scully is alleged to have built up a lucrative international child sexual abuse ring that offered pay-per-view video streams of children being sexually abused and tortured on the dark web. Among the victims who had their ordeals recorded and sold over the Internet was a five-year-old who was raped and tortured by Scully and two female accomplices.

Victims were procured by Scully with promises to impoverished parents of work or education, or were solicited by his two Filipina girlfriends, Carme Ann Alvarez and Liezyl Margallo Castaña, and other female acquaintances such as Maria Dorothea Chi y Chia. Both Alvarez and Margallo also abused children in Scully's videos.

In 2016, prosecutors alleged that Scully and a girlfriend coaxed two teenage girls to come to Scully's house with the promise of food. Scully was alleged to have given the girls alcohol and forced them to perform sex acts between them, a scene the photographer filmed. The prosecutor alleged that when the girls tried to escape, Scully forced them to dig graves in the basement of the house and threatened that he would bury them there. After five days, the girls were released by the girlfriend, Carme Ann Alvarez, who began feeling remorse after coming home to see the two in pet collars and reported what had happened.

Dark web child pornography 
Scully operated a secret dark web child pornography website known as "No limits fun" ("NLF"). The most notorious video Scully produced was Daisy's Destruction, which he sold on his site to clients for up to $10,000. Made in 2012, the multi-part video is so extreme that it was for some time regarded as an urban legend. It features the torture and rape of three girls by Scully and two Filipina women. Urged on by Scully, some of the most severe physical abuse was carried out on the children by one of his girlfriends, then 19-year-old Liezyl Margallo, who was formerly trafficked as a child.

Prior to the video gaining attention by the general public, Scully broadcast Daisy's Destruction privately on a pay-per-view basis. Due to the content, it quickly garnered attention by law enforcement and media. The Dutch National Child Exploitation Team was the first to open an investigation with the goal of locating the victims. Subsequently, an international manhunt for those responsible for the video's production was launched. Scully was tracked to Malaybalay City in the Philippines and arrested on 20 February 2015. Investigators had six warrants for his arrest, all relating to the abduction and sexual abuse of the two cousins. While they searched for Scully in the Philippines, investigators tracked down the three primary victims in Daisy's Destruction. Liza was found to be alive as was Daisy, who had lasting physical injuries from her severe mistreatment. According to Margallo, Scully recorded himself in a video with Cindy, in which he allegedly raped and tortured her, then made her dig her own grave before strangling her with a rope.

Among those who acquired and publicized the Daisy's Destruction video was one of the biggest-ever purveyors of child pornography, Scully's fellow Australian Matthew David Graham, better known by his online pseudonym Lux. Apprehended at age 22, Graham ran a series of "hurtcore" child pornography sites. Graham claimed that he had published the video on his own website "in the name of freedom".

Criminal charges 
Scully faced a total of 75 charges and, according to German television news channel n-tv, was alleged to have sexually abused 75 children. He was on trial with others who assisted in the production of his pornography, including four men: German Christian Rouche, Filipinos Alexander Lao and Althea Chia, and Brazilian Haniel Caetano de Oliveira. Margaret Akullo, then-Project Coordinator for the United Nations Office on Drugs and Crime and an expert on child abuse investigations, described the case as "horrific" and the worst she had ever heard of. His crimes were deemed so severe that some prosecutors supported the reintroduction of the death penalty as punishment for Scully, despite capital punishment being abolished in the Philippines since 2006.

In a March 2015 interview with Tara Brown on 60 Minutes, Scully said that he is currently writing a tell-all journal in prison where he will reflect on his motivations for raping young children.

In October 2015, a fire severely damaged the evidence room containing Scully's computer logs and videos, destroying key evidence. Some believe Scully may have bribed a local police officer, as corruption in the Philippines was rife as of the 2010s. On 13 June 2018, Scully and his girlfriend Alvarez were sentenced to life in prison. Judge Jose Escobido also ordered Scully and Alvarez to pay 5 million PHP (almost 87,000 USD) to the victims.

Both Scully and his sister complained about the conditions in the jail Scully is held in.

In November 2022, he received a second conviction and was sentenced to an additional 129 years in prison. Margallo was sentenced to 126 years, and two accomplices, Alexander Lao and Maria Dorothea Chia were given a 9-year sentence each. In total, there have been 60 cases filed against Scully.

See also 
Child pornography in the Philippines
Hurtcore
 List of serial rapists

References

External links 

1963 births
Living people
21st-century Australian criminals
Australian expatriates in the Philippines
Australian male criminals
Australian people convicted of child sexual abuse
Australian people convicted of rape
Australian people imprisoned abroad
Child sexual abuse in the Philippines
Crime in Oceania
Criminals from Melbourne
Dark web
Fugitives
Fugitives wanted by Australia
People charged with murder
People convicted of child pornography offenses
Place of birth missing (living people)
Sexual violence in Oceania
People from Narre Warren